The Bortier Gallery is a glazed shopping arcade in Brussels, Belgium. It was designed by Jean-Pierre Cluysenaer in 1847, in a neo-Renaissance style, and opened in the following year. As well as being one of the first European shopping arcades, it is a fine example of the joint use of cast iron and glass.

The gallery is situated in the centre of the City of Brussels, between the Mont des Arts/Kunstberg and the Grand-Place/Grote Markt (Brussels' main square), and not far from the more monumental Royal Saint-Hubert Galleries. It is owned by the City of Brussels and is managed by its Land Administration services. This site is served by Brussels Central Station on lines 1 and 5 of the Brussels Metro.

History

Early history
Originally, the gallery was a part of the / complex, a covered market also designed by the architect Jean-Pierre Cluysenaer. The facade on the /, in a Flemish Baroque style, antedates the construction of the gallery behind it. This front dates from 1763 and was recovered from the Hôtel des Grandes Messageries, a town house situated on that site.

The gallery owes its name to an investor named Pierre Bortier, who had acquired land between the / and the /, made available by the demolition of the former /. He proposed to the Brussels' authorities to build the /. This covered market had its main entrance on the Rue Duquesnoy. Starting from the Hôtel des Grandes Messageries, located on the Rue de la Madeleine, the gallery passed along the rounded southern end of the market hall on the level of its first floor, and ended on the Rue Saint-Jean.

20th and 21st centuries
The Madeleine market was demolished in 1957 and replaced by a modern event hall, leaving only the original facade in place. The Bortier Gallery was thus detached from the market building. Very degraded, it was renovated in 1974 and again around 2010.

The place is now well known to lovers of literature and old books, being almost entirely occupied, with the exception of an art gallery, with stalls and second-hand booksellers. Jean-Baptiste Moens, known as the father of philately, ran a shop in the Bortier Gallery from 1853 onwards.

Gallery

See also
 Arcade galleries in Brussels
 History of Brussels
 Belgium in "the long nineteenth century"

References

Bibliography

External links

 Bortier Gallery on www.ebru.be
 Bortier Gallery in www.eurobru.be

Shopping malls in Brussels
City of Brussels
Commercial buildings completed in 1847
1847 establishments in Belgium